Giles Francis Watling (born 18 February 1953) is a British Conservative Party politician serving as Member of Parliament (MP) for Clacton since 2017. Prior to entering politics, he was an actor.

Early life and education
Born in Chingford to actress Patricia Hicks and actor Jack Watling, Giles Watling was educated at Forest School in Walthamstow. He is the younger brother of the actress Deborah Watling and the younger half-brother of actress Dilys Watling.

Career
Watling has worked extensively in the British theatre and on television, but is probably best known for the role of the vicar Oswald in Carla Lane's series Bread. He has also directed several UK touring theatre productions. He took on the role of Bob in the UK Tour of 'Priscilla Queen of the Desert' in 2013, and serves on the board of directors at The Royal Theatrical Fund, a charity in aid of any person in need who has professionally practised or contributed to the theatrical arts.

He was a Conservative councillor for Frinton ward on Tendring District Council, having been first elected in the 2007 United Kingdom local elections. On 10 September 2014 he was shortlisted in the Conservatives' Clacton open primary to decide the party's candidate against Douglas Carswell in the Clacton by-election and was adopted following a public meeting on 11 September 2014. He lost the by-election in 2014 and the general election in 2015, but was elected in the general election in 2017. Compared with a 24.6% share of the vote he took in the 2014 by-election, his vote share was 72.3% in the 2019 general election.

Following an interim report on the connections between colonialism and properties now in the care of the National Trust, including links with historic slavery, Watling was among the signatories of a letter to The Telegraph in November 2020 from the "Common Sense Group" of Conservative Parliamentarians. The letter accused the National Trust of being "coloured by cultural Marxist dogma, colloquially known as the 'woke agenda'".

Filmography

References

External links

1953 births
English male stage actors
Living people
People from Chingford
People from Loughton
20th-century English male actors
English male television actors
Male actors from London
Conservative Party (UK) councillors
Councillors in Essex
British actor-politicians
21st-century English male actors
UK MPs 2017–2019
UK MPs 2019–present
People educated at Forest School, Walthamstow
Conservative Party (UK) MPs for English constituencies